Ninai is a waterfall in Dediapada taluka of Narmada district in the Indian state of Gujarat.

Geography

Ninai is located off State Highway 163 (Gujarat).  It is approximately 35 km from Dediapada and approximately 143 km from Surat. Nearest railway station is Bharuch which is around 125 km away and nearest airport is Surat

Waterfalls
The height of Ninai falls is more than 30 feet.

Geographical significance
Ninai Falls has tremendous beauty around it.  It is situated in Dediapada's beautiful forest ranges besides Shoolpaneshwar wildlife sanctuary.

Eco Tourism plan
The Narmada district collectorate is promoting the Sardar Sarovar dam and its surrounding tribal region as possible eco-tourism hotspots. The plan includes the Ninaighat waterfalls also.

See also
 List of waterfalls in India
 List of waterfalls in India by height
  Photograph of Ninai
  More Photographs of Ninai

References 

Waterfalls of Gujarat
Narmada district
Waterfalls of India